Mask is the second studio album by English gothic rock band Bauhaus. It was released on 16 October 1981 by record label Beggars Banquet.

Content 

Bauhaus expanded their style a bit on Mask, particularly by incorporating keyboards and acoustic guitar on songs such as "The Passion of Lovers", and funk rhythms and saxophone on tracks like "Kick in the Eye", "Dancing" and "In Fear of Fear".

The album cover is a drawing by guitarist Daniel Ash. The original artwork for the album was a gatefold sleeve with blue text on the inside and a stark black-and-white image of the band. On later editions this inside was replaced with white text and a montage from the promotional video for the song "Mask".

Release 

Mask was released in October 1981 by record label Beggars Banquet.

"Kick in the Eye" charted at No. 29 on the US Club Play Singles chart.

The 19 October 2009 CD reissue, subtitled the Omnibus Edition, included a remastered version of the original album as disc 1, a second disc of B-sides and alternate versions called Singles and Out-Takes, as well as a live CD called This Is for When..., recorded at Hammersmith Palais in London on 9 November 1981.

Reception and legacy 

In his retrospective review of the album, Ned Raggett of AllMusic called Mask "arguably even better than the band's almost flawless debut". Trouser Press described the album as "[Bauhaus'] finest achievement". Classic Rock reviewer Jonathan Selzer remarked how on Mask "Bauhaus managed to sound more expansive and less withdrawn, without losing any of their austere aura", gaining "a newfound accessibility that would see them break into the Top 30."

Mask was also included in the book 1001 Albums You Must Hear Before You Die. In the album's entry in the book, Australia's Fiend Magazine editor and contributing critic Alexandra Heller-Nicholas wrote that "The sounds were harder-edged than those of Bauhaus' debut, but the introduction of more pop-friendly melodies helped to make Mask digestible for a mainstream audience."

Track listing

Personnel 

Bauhaus
 Peter Murphy – vocals, additional guitar, production
 Daniel Ash – guitars, saxophone, album cover illustration, production
 David J – bass guitar, vocals, production
 Kevin Haskins – drums, keyboards, production

Technical
 John Etchells – engineering
 Kenny Jones – engineering
 Mike Hedges – engineering
 Arun Chakraverty – mastering
 Sheila Rock – sleeve photography
 John Dent – 2009 CD remastering

References

External links 

 
 Mask (Adobe Flash) at Radio3Net (streamed copy where licensed)

1981 albums
Bauhaus (band) albums
Beggars Banquet Records albums